Juan de Álava (1480-1537) was a Spanish architect best known for his stonework produced in the Plateresque style.

Life 
Juan de Álva was born in 1480 in Larrinoa, a locality of Zigoitia, Álava to a family of stonemasons. In 1502, de Álva traveled to Italy where he became familiar with Italian Renaissance architecture.

de Álva worked primarily in the city of Salamanca, where many of his notable works are situated.

Projects 

 Casa de las Muertes (1500), Salamanca
 New Cathedral of Plasencia (1513)
 Convento de San Esteban, Salamanca (1524)
 Cloister of Santiago de Compostela Cathedral, Santiago de Compostela
 Chapel of the University of Salamanca, Salamanca (demolished), Salamanca
 Colegio Mayor de Santiago el Zebedeo (completed 1578), Salamanca

References 

15th-century Spanish architects
16th-century Spanish architects
1480 births
1537 deaths
People from Álava
Architects from the Basque Country (autonomous community)